José Aldo da Silva Oliveira Júnior (born 9 September 1986), commonly anglicized as Jose Aldo, is a retired Brazilian  professional mixed martial artist. He last competed in the Ultimate Fighting Championship (UFC) in the Bantamweight division after previously competing at Featherweight, and was the fourth and final WEC Featherweight Champion. He became the first UFC Featherweight Champion following the UFC/WEC merger. Aldo is widely considered as one of the best mixed martial artists of all-time, and as the greatest featherweight ever after defending his UFC title seven times and his WEC title twice.

After his first MMA defeat in November 2005, Aldo remained undefeated for over a decade, winning 18 straight fights until UFC 194 in December 2015, when he lost to Conor McGregor.  He was named Sherdog's 2009 Fighter of the Year. In Sherdog's April 2017 pound-for-pound ranking, Aldo was called "the greatest featherweight in mixed martial arts history."

Background
José Aldo was born on 9 September 1986, in Manaus, Brazil. As an infant, Aldo was dropped onto a barbecue, leaving a permanent scar on the left side of his face. Throughout his teen years, he was keen on football and wanted to become a professional. His aspirations were supported by his father. But Aldo grew tired of getting beaten up in fights on the street, thus starting to train capoeira to learn ways to defend himself better in brawls. Aldo used to train capoeira on the streets after the classes, once gaining attention of a Brazilian jiu-jitsu trainer. He invited Aldo to try one session of jiu-jitsu and after the session, Aldo decided to leave capoeira to start training jiu-jitsu. At the age of 17, Aldo moved from Manaus to Rio de Janeiro having only his clothes with him and determination to train mixed martial arts there until he achieved something in the sport. He is a teammate and training partner of former UFC Bantamweight champion Renan Barão at Nova União.

Mixed martial arts career

Early career

Known by the nickname "Junior", José Aldo da Silva Oliveira Júnior fought his first professional MMA fight at the age of 17 at EcoFight 1 on 10 August 2004. He fought fellow countryman and newcomer Mário Bigola, whom he defeated by knockout in just 16 seconds into the first round. It would be Bigola's first and only professional fight.

Aldo fought fellow Brazilian Hudson Rocha, in his second fight for Shooto Brazil. The fight was ended by a doctor stoppage at the end of the first round due to a cut over Rocha's left eye, which was caused by a flying knee thrown by Aldo followed by a barrage of punches. Rocha was able to get back to his feet only to be met with more strikes and a knee before Aldo kicked his legs out from under him.

Five months later he fought MMA newcomer Luiz de Paula at Shooto – Brazil 7. Aldo took de Paula down in the clinch early on in the fight. He quickly gained mount, where he rained down punches before transitioning to an arm-triangle choke, forcing de Paula to tap at 1:54 of the first round.

Aldo spent the next several years jumping from organization to organization. He next fought Vale Tudo and Shooto veteran Aritano Silva Barbosa, who had lost four of his last five fights, at Rio MMA Challenge 1 on 12 May 2005. Aldo landed two knees to the chin of Barbosa in the opening seconds of the fight, sending him to the canvas where Aldo swarmed with punches. Barbosa attempted a single-leg takedown, but Aldo pulled away and threw two soccer kicks to the prone Barbosa before the referee stopped the fight at twenty seconds of the first round, awarding Aldo the victory via knockout. Less than two months later Aldo fought newcomer Anderson Silvério at Meca World Vale Tudo 12. He also defeated Silvério with soccer kicks, 8:33 into the first round.

Aldo then traveled to England, where he fought Micky Young at FX3- Battle of Britain on 15 October 2005. He defeated Young just 1:05 into the first round by TKO (punches).

Loss to Azevedo

Only a month later, in November 2005, Aldo went up a weight class to lightweight and fought respected Luta Livre black belt Luciano Azevedo at Jungle Fight 5. Aldo won the first round, winning most of the exchanges with solid combinations and leg kicks and stuffing Azevedo's numerous takedown attempts (he was nearly taken down early in the round, but appeared to purposefully fall out of the ropes to force a restart from the referee), as well as landing a solid knee as Azevedo went for a takedown. Aldo shrugged off Azevedo's first few takedown attempts in the second but was eventually taken down against the ropes by a double leg. Aldo raised his hips up looking for triangles and other submissions, but Azevedo easily defended.

Azevedo soon passed to half-guard and side control. He then transitioned to full mount. Aldo quickly gave up his back and rolled into the ropes. The referee restarted the fight in the center of the ring, where Azevedo locked his legs around Aldo in a body triangle. Aldo controlled Azevedo's hands for several seconds before falling back into the corner of the ring, where Azevedo was able to secure the fight-ending rear-naked choke 3:37 into round two. The loss was Aldo's first as a professional.

Rebound
Aldo rebounded in his next fight, returning to featherweight against the then-undefeated Thiago "Minu" Meller at Gold Fighters Championship I on 20 May 2006, winning a unanimous decision in a very close fight. Round one could have gone either way, with Aldo getting two takedowns (both times getting into half-guard) and cutting Meller's right eyebrow with a left hand. Meller went for two armbars, nearly hyper-extending Aldo's right arm in the first attempt before Aldo was able to escape. Aldo won a lackluster round two, again taking Meller down and landing some hammer fists. A seemingly exhausted Aldo stalled against the ropes much of the third round, holding Meller in the clinch. Both landed some solid strikes in the few exchanges there were in the round.

Pancrase
In his last bout before joining the WEC, Aldo fought Pancrase veteran Shoji Maruyama in the Pancrase 2007 Neo-Blood Tournament Finals. Aldo won a unanimous decision, dominating Maruyama standing and on the ground. In the first exchange, Aldo landed a front kick to Maruyama's body, sending him to the canvas. He was able to land the cleaner shots in exchanges, where he connected with leg kicks and knees while in the clinch. He took Maruyama down almost at will with trips and body-locks; whereas Maruyama failed in all his attempts to get Aldo to the mat. On the ground, Aldo was able to get side control as well as top and back mount.

World Extreme Cagefighting
Aldo made his debut for mixed martial arts promoter World Extreme Cagefighting on 1 June 2008, at the Arco Arena in Sacramento, California. In his debut with the organization he defeated renowned fighter Alexandre Franca Nogueira at WEC 34. Aldo won his fight on 7 June 2009, at WEC 41 against Cub Swanson via double flying knee eight seconds into the first round.

Aldo won the WEC Featherweight Championship against Mike Brown on November 18, 2009 at WEC 44. He won by TKO in the second round. He was able to get Brown in the back mount, where he landed a barrage of punches, ending the fight at 1:20 of the round. José Aldo was the recipient of Fighter of the Year accolades for 2009 from both MMA Live and Sherdog.com.

Aldo faced former titleholder Urijah Faber on 24 April 2010, at WEC 48. Aldo defeated Faber via unanimous decision (49–45, 49–45, and 50–45). Aldo was able to use effective leg and body kicks (a total of thirty-two) to stifle Faber, sending him to the canvas several times with solid kicks. For the remaining 1:40 of the fourth round, Aldo trapped Faber in the crucifix, peppering him with punches and elbows. Aldo did not engage most of the fifth (although he did land a body shot that nearly crumpled Faber). This was Aldo's first decision win in his WEC career.

Aldo defended his title against Manny Gamburyan by KO at 1:32 of the second round on 30 September 2010 at WEC 51.

Aldo and his camp have often mentioned his desire to eventually make the move up in weight to the lightweight division (155-pound limit). Having rolled through all of his opposition in the WEC featherweight class, the UFC offered Aldo a fight against Kenny Florian, who has challenged for the UFC lightweight title. Aldo and his camp declined the fight, instead deciding to remain at featherweight for the time being to defend his WEC belt.

Ultimate Fighting Championship

On 28 October 2010, World Extreme Cagefighting merged with the Ultimate Fighting Championship. As part of the merger, all WEC fighters were transferred to the UFC. Aldo became the inaugural UFC Featherweight Champion, receiving the first ever UFC featherweight title belt on Saturday, 20 November 2010 at UFC 123. His first defense was set to take place at UFC 125 against Josh Grispi. Aldo was forced to withdraw from UFC 125 after suffering a neck injury.

UFC Featherweight Champion

Aldo made his first title defense against Mark Hominick on 30 April 2011, at UFC 129 by defeating the Canadian by a unanimous decision in a bout that earned Fight of the Night honors.

Aldo had his second title defense against Kenny Florian on 8 October 2011, at UFC 136, where he won by unanimous decision.

Aldo next faced Chad Mendes on 14 January 2012, at UFC 142, Aldo won via KO in the final second of the first round. His post-fight celebration, where he sprinted out of the cage and into the crowd at the HSBC Arena in Rio, is regarded as one of his most iconic moments as champion.

After a series of injuries and opponent change-ups, Aldo faced former UFC Lightweight Champion Frankie Edgar at UFC 156. Aldo retained his belt via unanimous decision (49–46, 49–46, and 48–47).  The performance earned both participants Fight of the Night honors. This performance resulted in Aldo setting the record for most championship bouts, including his original title plus three defences.

Aldo was expected to face Anthony Pettis on 3 August 2013, at UFC 163. However, in mid-June Pettis pulled out of the bout citing a knee injury and was replaced by Chan Sung Jung. Aldo defeated Jung via fourth-round TKO, finishing Jung with a flurry of strikes after Jung suffered a dislocated shoulder while throwing an overhand right.

On 1 February 2014, at UFC 169 Aldo defended his title by defeating Ricardo Lamas by unanimous decision (49–46, 49–46, and 49–46).

Aldo again was in talks to fight Pettis after defending his title against Lamas. At the post-fight press conference, Aldo expressed interest to move up and fight Pettis at 155 lbs. However, those plans were quickly refuted as Pettis was selected to serve as a coach on The Ultimate Fighter 20.

A rematch with Chad Mendes was expected to take place on 2 August 2014, in the event headliner at UFC 176.  However, in early July, Aldo pulled out of the bout with an injury.  The rematch with Mendes was subsequently rescheduled and took place for 25 October 2014 at UFC 179. Despite getting dropped in the first round and being rocked in the third, Aldo scored two knockdowns of his own, one in the first and the other in the third and also rocked Mendes throughout the fight, winning four of the five rounds in the eyes of the judges thus taking the fight by unanimous decision (49–46, 49–46, and 49–46). The win also earned him his third Fight of the Night bonus award, and was selected Fight of the Year by multiple MMA outlets.

Losing the belt and further title fights 
Aldo was scheduled to face Conor McGregor on 11 July 2015, at UFC 189. On 30 June, Aldo pulled out of the fight, citing a rib injury which makes him unable to fight. Chad Mendes took his place and was defeated by McGregor for an interim title. Aldo faced McGregor in a title unification match on 12 December 2015, at UFC 194. He lost the fight via knockout 13 seconds into the first round, resulting in his first defeat in over ten years and his first ever loss at featherweight, ending a 15 fight win streak in the division.

Aldo faced Frankie Edgar in a rematch on 9 July 2016, at UFC 200 for the interim UFC Featherweight Championship. Aldo won the fight by unanimous decision (49–46, 49–46, and 48–47). On 26 November 2016, reigning UFC Featherweight Champion Conor McGregor was stripped of the title after winning the UFC Lightweight Championship, having never defended the Featherweight belt since he won it in December 2015. As a result, Aldo was promoted to Featherweight Champion.

Aldo faced interim featherweight champion Max Holloway in a title unification bout on 3 June 2017, in the main event at UFC 212. After winning the first two rounds on all three judges scorecards, he lost the fight by TKO in the third round. Despite the loss, the fight earned Aldo his fourth Fight of the Night bonus award. This was Aldo's 3rd loss in his 29 fight career.

Aldo was scheduled to face Ricardo Lamas on 16 December 2017, at UFC on Fox: Lawler vs. dos Anjos. However, Aldo was pulled from the bout in favour of a rematch with Holloway two weeks earlier at UFC 218, replacing an injured Frankie Edgar. Similarly to the first fight, Aldo found success in the opening rounds before slowing down and losing the fight via TKO in the third round.

Aldo faced Jeremy Stephens at UFC on Fox 30 on 28 July 2018. The fight was Aldo's first non-title (three round) fight in over nine years. Aldo won the fight by TKO after a left hook to the body dropped Stephens, and the fight was stopped due to subsequent strikes from Aldo. This win earned him the Performance of the Night award.

Aldo faced Renato Moicano on 2 February 2019 in the co-main event at UFC Fight Night 144. He won the fight via TKO in the second round. This win earned him the Performance of the Night award.

Aldo faced Alexander Volkanovski at UFC 237 on 11 May 2019, in Rio de Janeiro, Brazil. Aldo lost the fight via unanimous decision.

On 24 June 2019, it was announced that Aldo had signed a new exclusive eight-fight contract with the UFC prior to his bout with Volkanovski. This marked a major deviation from Aldo's previous firm stance on retiring by the end of 2019, in which he stated "I had already planned to stop when I was 30 years old and begin something else. I'm at a point where I have to make a decision, and nothing is going to change my mind. Martial arts is always going to be a part of my life, but everything has a beginning, a middle, and an end. And I see this coming to an end."

Move to Bantamweight 
On 23 October 2019, it was announced that Aldo would be moving down to the Bantamweight division. He faced Marlon Moraes at UFC 245 on 14 December 2019. He lost the largely contested bout via split decision.

Aldo was expected to face UFC Bantamweight Champion Henry Cejudo on 9 May 2020 at then UFC 250. However, Aldo pulled out on 8 April due to visa issues as the event was expected to be moved to the United States due to the COVID-19 pandemic. Following Cejudo's title defense against Dominick Cruz at UFC 249, Cejudo announced he would be retiring from active mixed martial arts competition and he vacated the UFC bantamweight championship. The UFC then announced that Aldo would be facing Petr Yan at UFC 251 on 12 July 2020, for the vacant bantamweight title. Aldo lost the bout via technical knockout in round five.

Aldo faced Marlon Vera on 19 December 2020 at UFC Fight Night 183. He won the fight via unanimous decision.

Aldo faced Pedro Munhoz on 7 August 2021 at UFC 265. He won the fight via unanimous decision.

Aldo faced Rob Font in the main event of UFC on ESPN 31 on 4 December 2021. After nearly finishing Font with punches multiple times, Aldo won the fight via unanimous decision.

Aldo faced Merab Dvalishvili on August 20, 2022 at UFC 278. He lost the bout via unanimous decision.

Retirement 
On September 18, 2022, the same day as the birth of his son, it was announced that Aldo had retired from MMA with one fight remaining on his UFC contract. Despite the initial reports, Aldo remains under contract with the UFC but was granted a permission to pursue opportunities in other sports.

Professional boxing career
After many years of publicly voicing his will to box, Aldo scheduled to make his professional boxing debut against Alberto Emmanuel Zambrano on February 10, 2023. He won the fight via unanimous decision. Aldo is now reportedly in talks to box Floyd Mayweather Jr..

Fighting style
Aldo is known primarily for his Muay Thai style striking and leg kicks, coupled with defensive wrestling. Aldo also holds a black belt in Brazilian native Catch wrestling style Luta livre and Brazilian Jiu-jitsu. He has also trained Muay Thai with Dutch shootboxer Andy Souwer since his fight with Mark Hominick.

On 28 September 2014, at Nova União, under the tutelage of Mestre Roberto Leitão (10th Dan), Daniel F. A. Malvino "Pirata" (1st Dan), Marco Ruas (7th Dan) and Daniel D'dane (4th Dan), Aldo was awarded his black belt in Luta Livre.  His Luta Livre instructor lineage is as follows: Roberto Leitão Sr. → João Ricardo N. de Almeida → Marco Ruas → José Aldo.

Aldo has the most wins and knockouts in UFC and WEC featherweight history; he has landed a total of 691 significant strikes in the UFC and the WEC.

Personal life
Aldo was poor growing up and often went on days with little to no food. WEC general manager Reed Harris states, "They were telling me that Wagnney Fabiano would be at the gym, and José would show up, and Wagnney would say, 'Have you eaten today or yesterday?' If not, they would go get him some food. That's how poor he was." When asked in an interview with WEC what his motivation is, Aldo replied, "My personal desires. My dream, my goal is to own my own house. This dream motivates me more and more as I get closer to fulfilling it." The Brazilian film Mais Forte que o Mundo was based on his early life.

Aldo is married to Vivianne Perreira, who has a purple belt in jiu-jitsu and has fought twice professionally in Muay Thai. Their daughter was born in 2012. On September 18, 2022, Vivianne gave birth to the couple's first son.

Aldo is an avid football fan and supports  Clube de Regatas do Flamengo and English Premier League club Chelsea FC.

He has let former President of Brazil Jair Bolsonaro stay in his Florida house after Lula's inauguration.

Instructor lineage

Brazilian Jiu-Jitsu 
Mitsuyo Maeda → Carlos Gracie → Carlson Gracie → André Pederneiras → José Aldo

Luta Livre 
Euclydes Hatem → Roberto Leitão → João Ricardo N. de Almeida →  Marco Ruas → José Aldo

Muay Thai 
Nélio "Naja" Borges → Luiz Alves → Marco Ruas → Pedro Rizzo → José Aldo

Championships and accomplishments

Mixed martial arts
Ultimate Fighting Championship
 UFC Hall of Fame (Modern-Era Wing, Class of 2023)
UFC Featherweight Championship (Two times, inaugural)
Seven successful title defenses (first reign)
Interim UFC Featherweight Champion (One time)
Most successful title defenses in UFC featherweight history (7)
Most consecutive title defenses in UFC featherweight history (7)
Fight of the Night (Four times) vs. Mark Hominick, Frankie Edgar, Chad Mendes, and Max Holloway
Performance of the Night (Two times) vs. Jeremy Stephens and Renato Moicano
World Extreme Cagefighting
WEC Featherweight Champion (One time; final)
Two successful title defenses
Youngest champion in WEC history
Knockout of the Night (Three times) vs. Rolando Perez, Cub Swanson, and Mike Brown
Most consecutive wins in WEC history (Eight)
Sherdog
2009 Fighter of the Year
2010 All-Violence Second Team
Mixed Martial Arts Hall of Fame
2021 Comeback Fighter of the Year
World MMA Awards
2010 Charles "Mask" Lewis Fighter of the Year
2014 Fight of the Year vs. Chad Mendes at UFC 179
ESPN
 2014 Fight of the Year vs. Chad Mendes at UFC 179
BloodyElbow.com
2014 Fight of the Year vs. Chad Mendes at UFC 179
MMAJunkie.com
2014 Fight of the Year vs. Chad Mendes at UFC 179
2014 October Fight of the Month vs. Chad Mendes
Wrestling Observer Newsletter
Feud of the Year (2015) vs. Conor McGregor

Grappling credentials 
CBJJ World Championships
2001 World Championship Bronze Medalist (blue belt)
CBJJ Brazilian Championships
2003 Brazilian National Champion (purple belt)
CBJJO Copa Del Mundo
2004 World Cup Champion (brown belt)

Mixed martial arts record

|-
|Loss
|align=center|31–8
|Merab Dvalishvili
|Decision (unanimous)
|UFC 278
|
|align=center|3
|align=center|5:00
|Salt Lake City, Utah, United States
|
|-
|Win
|align=center|31–7
|Rob Font
|Decision (unanimous)
|UFC on ESPN: Font vs. Aldo 
|
|align=center|5
|align=center|5:00
|Las Vegas, Nevada, United States
|
|-
|Win
|align=center|30–7
|Pedro Munhoz
|Decision (unanimous)
|UFC 265
|
|align=center|3
|align=center|5:00
|Houston, Texas, United States
|
|-
|Win
|align=center|29–7
|Marlon Vera
|Decision (unanimous)
|UFC Fight Night: Thompson vs. Neal
|
|align=center|3
|align=center|5:00
|Las Vegas, Nevada, United States
|
|-
|Loss
|align=center|28–7
|Petr Yan
|TKO (punches)
|UFC 251
|
|align=center|5
|align=center|3:24
|Abu Dhabi, United Arab Emirates
|
|-
|Loss
|align=center|28–6
|Marlon Moraes
|Decision (split)
|UFC 245
|
|align=center|3
|align=center|5:00
|Las Vegas, Nevada, United States
|
|-
|Loss
|align=center|28–5
|Alexander Volkanovski
|Decision (unanimous)
|UFC 237
|
|align=center|3
|align=center|5:00
|Rio de Janeiro, Brazil
|
|-
|Win
|align=center|28–4
|Renato Moicano
|TKO (punches)
|UFC Fight Night: Assunção vs. Moraes 2
|
|align=center|2
|align=center|0:44
|Fortaleza, Brazil
|
|-
|Win
|align=center|27–4
|Jeremy Stephens
|TKO (punches)
|UFC on Fox: Alvarez vs. Poirier 2
|
|align=center|1
|align=center|4:19
|Calgary, Alberta, Canada
|
|-
|Loss
|align=center|26–4
|Max Holloway
|TKO (punches)
|UFC 218
|
|align=center|3
|align=center|4:51
|Detroit, Michigan, United States
|
|-
|Loss
|align=center|26–3
|Max Holloway
|TKO (punches)
|UFC 212
|
|align=center|3
|align=center|4:13
|Rio de Janeiro, Brazil
|
|-
|Win
|align=center| 26–2
|Frankie Edgar
|Decision (unanimous)
|UFC 200
|
|align=center|5
|align=center|5:00
|Las Vegas, Nevada, United States
|
|-
|Loss
| align=center| 25–2
| Conor McGregor
| KO (punch)
| UFC 194
| 
| align=center| 1
| align=center| 0:13
| Las Vegas, Nevada, United States
| 
|-
|Win
| align=center| 25–1
| Chad Mendes
| Decision (unanimous)
| UFC 179
| 
| align=center| 5
| align=center| 5:00
| Rio de Janeiro, Brazil
| 
|-
| Win
| align=center| 24–1
| Ricardo Lamas
| Decision (unanimous)
| UFC 169
| 
| align=center| 5
| align=center| 5:00
| Newark, New Jersey, United States
| 
|-
| Win
| align=center| 23–1
| Chan Sung Jung
| TKO (punches)
| UFC 163
| 
| align=center| 4
| align=center| 2:00
| Rio de Janeiro, Brazil
| 
|-
| Win
| align=center| 22–1
| Frankie Edgar
| Decision (unanimous)
| UFC 156
| 
| align=center| 5
| align=center| 5:00
| Las Vegas, Nevada, United States
| 
|-
| Win
| align=center| 21–1
| Chad Mendes
| KO (knee)
| UFC 142
| 
| align=center| 1
| align=center| 4:59
| Rio de Janeiro, Brazil
| 
|-
| Win
| align=center| 20–1
| Kenny Florian
| Decision (unanimous)
| UFC 136
| 
| align=center| 5
| align=center| 5:00
| Houston, Texas, United States
| 
|-
| Win
| align=center| 19–1
| Mark Hominick
| Decision (unanimous)
| UFC 129
| 
| align=center| 5
| align=center| 5:00
| Toronto, Ontario, Canada
| 
|-
| Win
| align=center| 18–1
| Manny Gamburyan
| KO (punches)
| WEC 51
| 
| align=center| 2
| align=center| 1:32
| Broomfield, Colorado, United States
| 
|-
| Win
| align=center| 17–1
| Urijah Faber
| Decision (unanimous)
| WEC 48
| 
| align=center| 5
| align=center| 5:00
| Sacramento, California, United States
| 
|-
| Win
| align=center| 16–1
| Mike Brown
| TKO (punches)
| WEC 44
| 
| align=center| 2
| align=center| 1:20
| Las Vegas, Nevada, United States
| 
|-
| Win
| align=center| 15–1
| Cub Swanson
| TKO (flying knee and punches)
| WEC 41
| 
| align=center| 1
| align=center| 0:08
| Sacramento, California, United States
| 
|-
| Win
| align=center| 14–1
| Chris Mickle
| TKO (punches)
| WEC 39
| 
| align=center| 1
| align=center| 1:39
| Corpus Christi, Texas, United States
| 
|-
| Win
| align=center| 13–1
| Rolando Perez
| KO (knee and punches)
| WEC 38
| 
| align=center| 1
| align=center| 4:15
| San Diego, California, United States
| 
|-
| Win
| align=center| 12–1
| Jonathan Brookins
| TKO (punches)
| WEC 36
| 
| align=center| 3
| align=center| 0:45
| Hollywood, Florida, United States
| 
|-
| Win
| align=center| 11–1
| Alexandre Franca Nogueira
| TKO (punches)
| WEC 34
| 
| align=center| 2
| align=center| 3:22
| Sacramento, California, United States
| 
|-
| Win
| align=center| 10–1
| Shoji Maruyama
| Decision (unanimous)
| Pancrase: 2007 Neo-Blood Tournament Finals
| 
| align=center| 3
| align=center| 5:00
| Tokyo, Japan
| 
|-
| Win
| align=center| 9–1
| Fábio Mello
| Decision (unanimous)
| Top Fighting Championships 3
| 
| align=center| 3
| align=center| 5:00
| Rio de Janeiro, Brazil
| 
|-
| Win
| align=center| 8–1
| Thiago Meller
| Decision (majority)
| Gold Fighters Championship 1
| 
| align=center| 3
| align=center| 5:00
| Rio de Janeiro, Brazil
|
|-
| Loss
| align=center| 7–1
| Luciano Azevedo
| Submission (rear-naked choke)
| Jungle Fight 5
| 
| align=center| 2
| align=center| 3:37
| Manaus, Brazil
| 
|-
|-
| Win
| align=center| 7–0
| Micky Young
| TKO (punches)
| FX3: Battle of Britain
| 
| align=center| 1
| align=center| 1:05
| Reading, England
| 
|-
| Win
| align=center| 6–0
| Phil Harris
| TKO (doctor stoppage)
| UK-1: Fight Night
| 
| align=center| 1
| align=center| N/A
| Portsmouth, England
| 
|-
| Win
| align=center| 5–0
| Anderson Silverio
| TKO (submission to soccer kicks)
| Meca World Vale Tudo 12
| 
| align=center| 1
| align=center| 8:33
| Rio de Janeiro, Brazil
| 
|-
| Win
| align=center| 4–0
| Aritano Silva Barbosa
| KO (soccer kicks)
| Rio MMA Challenge 1
| 
| align=center| 1
| align=center| 0:20
| Rio de Janeiro, Brazil
| 
|-
| Win
| align=center| 3–0
| Luiz de Paula
| Submission (arm-triangle choke)
| Shooto Brazil 7
| 
| align=center| 1
| align=center| 1:54
| Rio de Janeiro, Brazil
| 
|-
| Win
| align=center| 2–0
| Hudson Rocha
| TKO (doctor stoppage)
| Shooto Brazil
| 
| align=center| 1
| align=center| 5:00
| São Paulo, Brazil
| 
|-
| Win
| align=center| 1–0
| Mario Bigola
| KO (head kick)
| EcoFight 1
| 
| align=center| 1
| align=center| 0:18
| Macapá, Brazil
|

Professional boxing record

Pay-per-view bouts 
{|class="wikitable sortable"
!No
!Event
!Fight
!Date
!Venue
!City
!PPV buys
|-
|1.
|WEC 48
|Aldo vs. Faber
|24 April 2010
|ARCO Arena
|Sacramento, California, U.S
|175,000
|-
|2.
|UFC 142
|Aldo vs. Mendes
|14 January 2012
|HSBC Arena
|Rio de Janeiro, Brazil
|235,000
|-
|3.
|UFC 156
|Aldo vs. Edgar
|2 February 2013
|Mandalay Bay Events Center
|Paradise, Nevada, U.S
|330,000
|-
|4.
|UFC 163
|Aldo vs. Korean Zombie
|3 August 2013
|HSBC Arena
|Rio de Janeiro, Brazil
|180,000
|-
|5.
|UFC 179
|Aldo vs. Mendes 2
|25 October 2014
|Ginásio do Maracanãzinho
|Rio de Janeiro, Brazil
|180,000
|-
|6.
|UFC 194
|Aldo vs. McGregor
| 12 December 2015
|MGM Grand Garden Arena
|Las Vegas, Nevada, U.S
|1,200,000
|-
|7.
|UFC 212
|Aldo vs. Holloway
|3 June 2017
|Jeunesse Arena
|Rio de Janeiro, Brazil
|200,000
|-
|8.
|UFC 218
|Holloway vs. Aldo 2
|2 December 2017
|Little Caesars Arena
|Detroit, Michigan, U.S
|230,000
|-
! colspan="6" |Total sales
! 2,730,000

See also 
 List of current mixed martial arts champions
 List of male mixed martial artists

References

External links

 
 

1986 births
Living people
Brazilian male mixed martial artists
Brazilian practitioners of Brazilian jiu-jitsu
Brazilian capoeira practitioners
Brazilian Muay Thai practitioners
Brazilian catch wrestlers
Lightweight mixed martial artists
Featherweight mixed martial artists
Mixed martial artists utilizing Brazilian jiu-jitsu
Mixed martial artists utilizing capoeira
Mixed martial artists utilizing Muay Thai
Mixed martial artists utilizing catch wrestling
Mixed martial artists utilizing Luta Livre
World Extreme Cagefighting champions
People from Manaus
Brazilian people of African descent
Brazilian people of indigenous peoples descent
Brazilian people of Portuguese descent
Ultimate Fighting Championship male fighters
Ultimate Fighting Championship champions
People awarded a black belt in Brazilian jiu-jitsu
Sportspeople from Amazonas (Brazilian state)